The Kapisanan ng Paglilingkod sa Bagong Pilipinas (Association for Service to the New Philippines), or KALIBAPI, was a fascist Filipino political party that served as the sole party of state during the Japanese occupation. It was intended to be a Filipino version of Japan's governing Imperial Rule Assistance Association.

History 
Formed by the Philippine Executive Commission (Komisyong Tagapagpaganap ng Pilipinas) under the leadership of Jorge Vargas, the party was created by Proclamation No. 109 of the PEC, a piece of legislation passed on December 8, 1942, banning all existing political parties and creating the new governing alliance. The Japanese had already dissolved all political parties on the islands, even including the pro-Japanese Ganap Party, and established KALIBAPI as a mass movement designed to support the occupation whilst taking advantage of Filipino nationalism in the region. Inaugurated on December 30, 1942, the death anniversary of Filipino writer and national hero José Rizal, "to emphasize the patriotic basis of the organization", the party was headed by its Director-General Benigno S. Aquino with Pio Duran as Secretary-General and effective second in command and Ganap leader Benigno Ramos as a member of the executive committee. The three toured the Philippines, setting up local party organisations and promoting the "new order in East Asia" at mass meetings.

For the Japanese, KALIBAPI served as a labour recruitment service in its initial stages before taking on an expanded role in mid 1943. It was left to KALIBAPI to write the new constitution and establish the new National Assembly, resulting in Aquino's appointment as Speaker (as his replacement as Director-General by Camilo Osías). All 54 members of the Assembly were KALIBAPI members, although 33 of them had held elected office before the invasion as well. KALIBAPI soon claimed a membership that ran into the hundreds of thousands. The islands were declared officially independent as the Second Philippine Republic on 14 October 1943 under the Presidency of José P. Laurel and his KALIBAPI government. This had been accomplished through the Preparatory Committee for Philippine Independence, which KALIBAPI had established in mid-1943 under Japanese direction.

Taking a highly nationalistic standpoint, KALIBAPI was active in initiatives to promote the Tagalog language as a central feature of Filipino identity. To this end a pared-down, 1000 word version of the language was promoted to be learned rapidly by those not yet versed in the language. The general nationalism of Laurel's government strained relations with Japan, particularly as Laurel had refused to declare war on the United States and United Kingdom. As such the Japanese instructed Ramos to form a new group, Makapili, in November 1944 to give more tangible military support to the Japanese.

KALIBAPI disappeared after the Japanese surrender with some of its leaders arrested for collaboration and treason. No former KALIBAPI candidates ran for office in the 1946 general election, and some of those not arrested went into hiding in Philippines, exile in Japan, or were executed by vengeful Filipinos or the communist-aligned Hukbalahap members.

Sources

References

Defunct political parties in the Philippines
Filipino collaborators with Imperial Japan
Parties of one-party systems
Political parties established in 1942
Political parties disestablished in 1945
Fascist parties
1942 establishments in the Philippines